Sur les femmes (Essay on Women) is an essay by Denis Diderot published in Correspondance littéraire in 1772. It contains a response to Antoine Léonard Thomas's Essay on the Character, Morals, and Mind of Women in Different Centuries, which was also published in 1772, and includes Diderot's own views on the subject.

Background
Besides the interest in responding to Thomas's essay, there occurred two incidents in Diderot's personal life at this time, both involving women, which are believed to have played a role in his crafting of this essay. The first of these was that although he remained friends with Mme de Maux, their romantic relationship had come to an end. The second was that his daughter Angélique had become engaged to Caroillon de Vandeul whom she would later marry. But, simultaneously, Angélique's harpsichord teacher, who would regularly enjoy the hospitality of the Diderot household, had become persona non grata in Diderot's house. There is speculation that he may have made unwelcome advances towards Angélique.

Content
Diderot begins the essay by commending Thomas' independence and nobility, but then criticizes him for lacking feeling. According to Diderot, "when writing about women, we must dip our pens in the rainbow and dry the ink with the dust of butterfly wings." He goes on to describe women as "beautiful as the seraphim of Klopstock, terrible as the devils of Milton"; and provides further evidence that he is writing from a male perspective when he states that "The symbol of woman in general is that of the Apocalypse, on the forehead of which is written: Mystery."

The essay then goes on to present original views on the legal status of wives; and the effect of sexual arousal, sexual hysteria, menstruation, pregnancy, and menopause in women. Diderot also weighs in on what he considers some extremes present in women; he comments that they may faint on seeing a spider or a mouse, but that they are also capable of withstanding the greatest horrors known to humanity. He characterizes women as being relentless in love and ruthless in hate.

Diderot also notes that in almost every country Nature and civil laws have combined in a way that is cruel to women. He states that women have been treated like imbecile children; and blames men for exercising unbridled harassment on women.

On the words "I love you"
In the essay, Diderot gives his interpretation of the words "I love you":

Reception
Wilson comments that, although Diderot writes this essay from a male perspective, he is more empathetic towards women than most writers of his time. Fellows suggests that Diderot's interpretation of the words "I love you" may have been propelled by the behavior of Angélique's tutor towards her. In her essay "Sexual/Textual Politics in the Enlightenment: Diderot and d'Epinay Respond to Thomas's Essay on Women" Illinois State University professor Mary Trouille comments that "Oscillating continually between an attitude of sympathy and scorn for women, between images of idealization and vituperation, Diderot (like Thomas) leaves the reader perplexed and uncertain as to his true beliefs. One has the impression that Sur Les Femmes is a mere exercise in rhetoric intended less to persuade, than to impress and entertain."

Further reading

References

Notes

Denis Diderot